Matsumae may refer to:

 Matsumae (surname), a Japanese surname
 Matsumae clan, a former Japanese clan
 Matsumae Castle, a castle located in Matsumae in Hokkaidō, Japan
 Matsumae, Hokkaidō, a town located in Matsumae District, Oshima, Hokkaidō, Japan
 Matsumae District, Hokkaidō, a district located in southwestern Oshima Subprefecture, Hokkaidō, Japan